, meaning "Bed of Awakening" is a scenic spot in Japan, located in Agematsu, Kiso District, Nagano Prefecture. It is a nationally designated Place of Scenic Beauty.

Overview 
One onomatological explanation is that it was named "Bed of Awakening" because the stunning view stimulated even drowsy onlookers such that they would become wide awake. There are naturally occurring eroded granite rock formations here, and some of these are claimed to resemble the shapes of lions, lotus flower, etc.

Folk tradition claims that the name derives from Urashima Tarō experiencing an "awakening" here, that is, the sensation that everything in his life up to then was as if in a dream.

It was selected as one of nationally designated places of scenic beauty in Nagano.

There used to be rapid currents that created the formation, but the water level has lowered due to such factors as the Kiso Dam upstream that came into operation in 1968 , exposing more of the granite formation which used to be underwater.

History
There have been waka poetry composed on the Kiso scenery while traveling the Nakasendō that employed  "nezame" as keyword (utamakura).

Rinsenji
The  in Agematsu stands on a cliff overlooking the strange rock formations of Nezame no toko. According to the engi (story of origin) of this temple, which stands nearby overlooking the scenery, Rinsenji originally enshrined the Benten statue which local legend said Urashima had left behind.

The temple totally burnt down in 1864, except for the Benten-dō, and rebuilt the following year. A new main hall, restored to its original appearance was erected in 1971. The surviving Benten-dō structure was completed 1712 under the auspices of Tokugawa Yoshimichi, fourth daimyō of the Owari Domain.

There is also the Urashima-dō, which is a distinctly separate structure. It has stood on top of the tokoiwa ("Bed Rock").

The temple's treasure hall houses a fishing pole, alleged to have belonged to Urashima.

Mikaeri no okina 
According to folk tradition, there resided in the hamlet of Nezame an old man named  who provided wonder-medicine to the folk.

The noh play  from the late Muromachi Period is based on this tradition.

In the Noh play, the Emperor of Japan during the Engi Era hears of the elixir of longevity, and sends a messenger from court to investigate. The old man reveals himself to be an avatar of the Yakushi Nyorai, calling himself , and presents the medicine. It is explained that he has lived at Nezame no toko for a thousand years, and has rejuvenated himself three times with the medicine, earning  the name Mikaeri meaning "thrice reverted".

Urashima Tarō legend 

Although this is in the mountainous terrain of Kiso and far from any ocean, there has arisen a local tradition associating the spot with Urashima Tarō, the man who went to the Dragon Palace beyond the sea.

One of the oldest known records indicating local association of this scenic spot with Urashima Tarō is the mention of the so-called Urashima-ga-tsuri-ishi ("Urashima's fishing stone") by Zen priest Takuan in his travelogue Kisoji kikō ki.

Kaibara Ekken also says in his Kisoji no ki (1685) that he witnessed the "Nezame no toko where Urashima fished," but he is skeptical about Urashima ever visiting this area.

After traveling various parts of Japan, he settled in a beautiful village by Kiso River. He lived here many years fishing for leisure, while peddling the medicine he had learned to conjure using the esoteric book. One day while storytelling to the villagers about the Dragon Palace, he opened his box, and turned into a 300-year-old man. On the 1st year of Tenkei (938) he disappeared from the face of the earth.

The Ryaku-engi has gone through many reprints, with the oldest surviving being the revised print of 1756, However, the gist of the legend is thought to have been established earlier, from the near-modern period.

From some point in local tradition, The Mikaeri no okina and Urashima Tarō came to be seen as the same personage. The Ryaku-engii also states that Urashima earned the moniker  for being the provender of the magical drug to the villagers.。

An old, pre-Takemoto jōruri called Urashima Tarō was written with this Agematsu area as its setting.

Basil Hall Chamberlain also described the monument off the route of the Nakasendō highway, near Suhara-juku station, and mentioned its association with Urashima, the Japanese Rip van Winkle.

See also 

 List of Places of Scenic Beauty of Japan (Nagano)

Explanatory notes

References

Citations

Bibliography

External links 
 

Tourist attractions in Nagano Prefecture

Landforms of Nagano Prefecture
Agematsu, Nagano
Places of Scenic Beauty
IUCN Category III